Reliance Retail is an Indian retail company and a subsidiary of Reliance Industries. Founded in 2006, it is the largest retailer in India in terms of revenue. Its retail outlets offer foods, groceries, apparel, footwear, toys, home improvement products, electronic goods, and farm implements and inputs. Apart from physical outlets, the company also sells products on its e-commerce channels. It has 280,000 employees at 16,700 store locations.

History
On 23 September, it was announced that KKR has bought 1.28% stake for ₹5,500 crore valuing the venture at ₹4.28 trillion or $58 billion.

In October 2020, Singapore's GIC bought a 1.22% stake for $752 million, while TPG acquired a 0.41% stake for $250 million giving Reliance Retail a pre-money valuation of $58.5 billion.

In 2022, Reliance Retail launched fashion stores under Azorte brand, under which it retails footwear, fashion accessories, home and beauty products.

In March 2023, Reliance Consumer Products (RCPL), the fast-moving consumer goods arm and subsidiary of Reliance Retail Ventures (RRVL) announced the relaunch of the iconic brand, Campa Cola.

Financials
Reliance Retail had a turnover of ₹337 billion in the financial year 2016–17. Reliance Retail announced revenues of ₹450 billion for the nine months ended December 2017 for financial year 2017–18, showing over a 90% jump from the corresponding previous period. The company also reported a profit of ₹7 billion for the period. In financial year 2019–2020, the company reported revenue of ₹1.62 trillion and EBITDA of 9,654 crore growing 55.7% year over year.

Acquisitions and partnerships 
On 29 August 2020, Reliance Retail announced that it is acquiring the retail, wholesale, logistics and warehousing business from the Future Group for  adding 15 lakh square meters of retail space to the company.

On 15 November 2020, Reliance Retail announced that it had acquired a majority ownership of the furniture and decorating company Urban Ladder.

On 7 October 2021, the company announced its partnership with 7-Eleven to open its stores in India. The announcement came a day after Future Group announced the end of its partnership with 7-Eleven, citing the inability to meet the target of opening stores and payment of franchisee fees. The first 7-Eleven in India opened in Mumbai.

October 2021:- Acquired Milkbasket

On 6 January 2022, Reliance Retail invested $200 million in Dunzo for 25.8% stake.

In December 2022，Reliance Retail signed definitive agreements to acquire 100% equity stake in METRO Cash & Carry India Pvt Ltd. (‘METRO India’) for a total cash consideration of ₹2,850 crore, subject to closing adjustments.

In 2022, Campa Cola was acquired by Reliance Industries for ₹22 crores. Reliance Retail Ventures, the retail arm of the Reliance group launched three variants of the drinks (cola, orange and lemon) at some select stores.

Subsidiaries and divisions

There are over 45 subsidiaries and divisions of Reliance Retail. Following is a list of major divisions:

Products and services

Private label products 
Although Reliance Retail's grocery businesses primarily markets products of third party FMCG players, they also sell inhouse brands including: Best Farms, Good Life, Enzo, Mopz, Expelz and Home One.

References

External links
 

Reliance Industries subsidiaries
Retail companies of India
Retail companies established in 2006
Companies based in Mumbai
Clothing brands of India
Reliance Retail
Indian companies established in 2006
2006 establishments in Maharashtra